Ayaz Ahmed (born 24 September 1986) is an Indian television actor. He made his debut on television as a contestant in the popular reality show MTV Roadies. He is famous for his role in Kaisi Yeh Yaariaan.

Early life
Ahmed was born on 24 September 1986 and brought up in Howrah, West Bengal, India. He studied at St. Thomas Church School, and later pursued Law from Calcutta University, following his father's footsteps.

Career
Ahmed made his debut as a contestant in the popular reality show MTV Roadies 5. After his stint in Roadies, he played a small role in Kitani Mohabbat Hai. He later appeared in a number of shows such as Tujh Sang Preet Lagai Sajna, Ishaan, Meri Toh Lag Gayi... Naukri, I Luv My India, Parvarrish - Kuchh Khattee Kuchh Meethi, Do Dil Ek Jaan, Ishq Kills, MTV Webbed, Kaisi Yeh Yaariaan, Santoshi Maa and Agniphera.

Television

Web series

References

External links
 

Living people
Indian male television actors
Indian male soap opera actors
1986 births